Now Deh-e Sharif (also Romanized as Now Deh-e Sharīf; also known as Now Deh-e Ḩājjī Sharīf) is a village in Estarabad-e Shomali Rural District, Baharan District, Gorgan County, Golestan Province, Iran. At the 2006 census, its population was 632, in 149 families.

References 

Populated places in Gorgan County